Motech Records (commonly abbreviated to Motech) is a Techno record label founded in 2002 and is operated by producer / DJ Franki Juncaj commonly known as DJ 3000. It is based in Detroit, Michigan though also has operations in the Netherlands.

Juncaj founded Motech Records "in 2002 with my best friend Shawn Snell because we saw that electronic music, not only coming out of Detroit, but in general, was getting formulaic and somewhat predictable. We wanted to take the influences we had been exposed to and create something that was our own." Juncaj said he discovered that there were others producing music that was "atypical" to the Detroit sound. From there, Motech Records became an outlet to push boundaries without having to prove anything. Since the initial releases primarily focused on Juncaj's productions under the DJ 3000 moniker, the Motech Records roster has grown internationally to include artists such as Robert Hood, Ken Ishii, Samuel L Session and Mark Broom.

Notable artists from past and present
 DJ 3000 (label head)
 Black Phuture
 Gerald Mitchell
 Santiago Salazar
 Subotika
 Gary Martin
 Esteban Adame
 Shawn Snell
 DJ Compufunk
 Ellen Allien
 Jack De Marseille
 Robert Hood
 Samuel L Session
 Ken Ishii
 Alexis Tyrel
 Aux 88
 T. Linder
 Mark Broom
 Mark Flash
 Orlando Voorn
 DJ Bone
 Max Tkacz
 OktoRed
 Diametric
 Veronique Page

References

External links 
 The official Motech Records website
 Motech Records Discogs page

Record labels established in 2002
Techno record labels
American record labels
2002 establishments in Michigan
Companies based in Detroit